Bad Moms is a 2016 American comedy film directed and written by Jon Lucas and Scott Moore. The film stars an ensemble cast that includes Mila Kunis, Kristen Bell, Kathryn Hahn, Jay Hernandez, Annie Mumolo, Jada Pinkett Smith, and Christina Applegate.

Principal photography began on January 11, 2016, in New Orleans. The film premiered on July 19, 2016, in New York City and was theatrically released on July 29, 2016, by STX Entertainment. It received mixed reviews from critics and grossed over $183 million worldwide, becoming the first film from STX to gross $100 million domestically.

A sequel, titled A Bad Moms Christmas, was released on November 1, 2017.

Plot
Amy Mitchell is a 32-year-old woman who is married and is living in the Chicago suburbs with her kids, Jane and Dylan, overworked and overcommitted. She is a sales rep for a coffee company, prepares healthful lunches for her children, does their homework, goes to all of their extracurricular activities, and is active in the PTA, run by the domineering Gwendolyn James and her cronies, Stacy and Vicky.

When Amy catches her husband Mike cheating on her with a camgirl, she kicks him out and attempts to keep everything together. After a particularly stressful day, Amy publicly quits the PTA due to Gwendolyn's overzealous bake sale. At a nearby bar, she meets Carla, a laid-back, sexually active single mom, and Kiki, a stay-at-home mom of four who admires Amy's dissent. Amy and Carla are irritated to see that Kiki's husband is domineering, expecting her to take care of all the kids and the house without help, while Amy and Kiki are taken aback by Carla's very hands-off approach to parenting.

The three embark on an all-night bender, inspiring Amy to loosen up with her kids: she takes them for rides in Mike's sportscar, gets them lunch from Arby's, forces Dylan to fend for himself to prevent him from being entitled, and takes the overachieving and stressed Jane for a spa day. Amy herself wants to start dating again but is inexperienced as she had a shotgun marriage at 20. She ultimately strikes up a conversation with Jessie: a kind, handsome widower and single father at the school with a crush on her, leading to them kissing. 

When Amy brings store-bought donut holes to the bake sale, she draws the ire of Gwendolyn, who uses her PTA authority to get Jane benched from the soccer team. Angered, Amy decides to run for PTA president against her. A meet-and-greet at Amy's draws only one visitor, who tells them Gwendolyn has launched a rival party at her own house, catered by Martha Stewart. The other moms and Martha swiftly abandon Gwendolyn's party when it becomes clear that she intends to lecture them all evening, leading to a successful party at Amy's house. Afterwards, Amy discovers that Carla had “booty texted” Jessie from Amy’s phone. Jessie forgives Amy and asks if she wants him to leave, which she doesn't, and they sleep together.

Gwendolyn responds to Amy’s antics by putting joints in Jane's locker, framing her and getting her kicked out of all extracurricular activities. Not only do Jane and Dylan both go to stay with Mike, who has agreed to an amicable divorce, but Amy loses her job because she's taken too much time off. 

A despondent Amy stays home during the PTA election but is fired up by Carla and Kiki (who finally stands up to her husband, ordering him to deal with everything alone until after the election). At the event, Amy gives an inspiring speech about how overworked moms need to take time off, do fewer and less stressful events, and most importantly, allow themselves to make mistakes. She wins by a landslide and winds up comforting a devastated Gwendolyn, who reveals her life is not perfect and that her husband was arrested for embezzlement.

Weeks later, Amy's approach has led to positive changes: Jane has been reinstated to the soccer team and is stressing out less, Dylan is applying himself, Kiki makes her husband help out with the kids, Carla is more responsible and hands-on, Gwendolyn is kinder with everyone, and all of the other moms are feeling more energized. Amy herself gets her job back with much better compensation after her weak-willed boss sees how much he had taken her for granted, and she continues to see Jessie. Gwendolyn invites Amy, Carla, and Kiki for a day of fun on her husband's private jet.

Cast

 Mila Kunis as Amy Mitchell
 Kristen Bell as Kiki
 Kathryn Hahn as Carla Dunkler
 Christina Applegate as Gwendolyn James
 Jada Pinkett Smith as Stacy
 Annie Mumolo as Vicky
 Jay Hernandez as Jessie Harkness
 Oona Laurence as Jane Mitchell
 Emjay Anthony as Dylan Mitchell
 David Walton as Mike Mitchell
 Clark Duke as Dale Kipler
 Wanda Sykes as Dr. Elizabeth Karl
 Wendell Pierce as Principal Daryl Burr
 J. J. Watt as Coach Craig
 Megan Ferguson as Tessa
 Lyle Brocato as Kent
 Cade Cooksey as Jaxon
 Martha Stewart as herself
 Eugenia Kuzmina as Russian Mom
 Lilly Singh as Cathy

Production
On April 30, 2015, it was announced that Jon Lucas and Scott Moore were set to direct an untitled female-led comedy, based on their own original script. Bill Block of Block Entertainment and Raj Brinder Singh of Merced Media Partners would produce the film, along with Judd Apatow and Josh Church through Apatow Productions, while Merced Media financing the film. Leslie Mann was set to star in the lead role. This was Bill Block's first film produced through Block Entertainment after leaving QED International. Paramount Pictures acquired the film's distribution rights on May 8, 2015. The film was sold to different international distributors at the 2015 Cannes Film Festival. On June 1, 2015, Mann and Apatow exited the film because of scheduling conflicts. On October 26, 2015, it was reported that Paramount had left the project, with STX Entertainment coming on board to handle the American distribution. Mila Kunis, Christina Applegate, and Kristen Bell joined the film, starring in its lead roles, while Suzanne Todd produced the film along with Block. On January 11, 2016, Jada Pinkett Smith and Kathryn Hahn joined the film, with Smith playing Applegate's blunt best friend, and Hahn also playing a mother. It was later revealed that Oona Laurence had also joined the cast.

Filming
Principal photography on the film began on January 11, 2016 in New Orleans and concluded on March 1, 2016.

Release
In May 2015, Paramount set the film's release date for April 15, 2016, but later, in July 2015, the studio moved the film out to a new unspecified release date. STX Entertainment later bought the distribution rights to the film and scheduled for August 19, 2016, before eventually releasing it on July 29, 2016, swapping release dates with The Space Between Us.

Bad Moms grossed $113.2 million in the United States and Canada and $70.7 million in other territories for a worldwide total of $183.9 million, against a budget of $20 million.
Bad Moms was released in the United States and Canada on July 29, 2016, alongside Jason Bourne and Nerve, and was projected to gross around $25 million in its opening weekend, from 3,215 theaters. It grossed $2.1 million from Thursday night previews. In its opening weekend, the film grossed $23.8 million, finishing 3rd at the box office. On September 3, the film crossed $100 million domestically, becoming STX Entertainment's first film to do so. Deadline Hollywood calculated the net profit of the film to be $50.8 million, when factoring together all expenses and revenues.

Home media
Bad Moms was released on DVD and Blu-ray on November 1, 2016 by Universal Studios Home Entertainment.

Reception
Bad Moms received mixed reviews. On Rotten Tomatoes the film has an approval rating of 58% based on 172 reviews with an average rating of 5.60/10. The site's critical consensus reads, "Bad Moms boasts a terrific cast and a welcome twist on domestic comedy – and they're often enough to compensate for the movie's unfortunate inability to take full advantage of its assets." On Metacritic, the film has a score of 60 out of 100 based on 34 critics, indicating "mixed or average reviews".  Audiences polled by CinemaScore gave the film an average grade of "A" on an A+ to F scale.

IGN gave the film 7/10, saying, "[t]he uneven Bad Moms is an entry in the slobs versus snobs genre that never quite realizes its full comedic potential." Chris Nashawaty of Entertainment Weekly gave it an A−, writing: "beneath all of its hard-R partying, rebellious debauchery, and profanity, it taps into something very real and insidious in the zeitgeist. It's one of the funniest movies of the year—and one of the most necessary." Peter Travers and Kyle Smith both gave 2½ stars out of 4, with Travers saying: "the movie cops out by going soft in the end, but it's still hardcore hilarity for stressed moms looking for a girls night out", and Smith saying: "Bad Moms is like Sex and the City: The Sneakers-and-Minivan Years, a good-natured girl-power comedy that balances a bland sitcom structure with some weird and hilarious moments."
 
The A.V. Clubs Jesse Hassenger opined that Bad Moms "sells its characters' struggle short by shuffling their kids off screen whenever it's convenient, and not even in the name of comical neglect; there always seems to be time and money to get a sitter. ... [This] at times turns the movie into a referendum on unhelpful husbands of well-off moms, rather than the absurdities of Perfect Mom culture."  Lindsey Bahr of the Associated Press wrote, "Bad Moms had so many opportunities to be great, edgy and insightful, but instead settles for the most milquetoast commentary possible on modern motherhood."

Accolades
For the 43rd People's Choice Awards, held January 18, 2017, the film achieved accolades by winning the Favorite Comedy Movie and also garnered a nomination for Kristen Bell for Favorite Comedic Movie Actress.

Sequel and spin-off

A Bad Moms Christmas (2017)
Directors of the first film, Lucas and Moore, have stated that they may get involved with the previously announced spin-off, but that their current focus is to make a sequel to Bad Moms. On December 23, 2016, it was announced that A Bad Moms Christmas would be released on November 1, 2017, and that it would be holiday themed, with Bell, Hahn, and Kunis all returning to reprise their roles. On May 2, 2017, Susan Sarandon, Christine Baranski, Cheryl Hines, and Peter Gallagher joined the cast of the film.

Bad Dads
In October 2016, STX Entertainment announced a spin-off film titled Bad Dads and set a release date for July 14, 2017. However, by December 2020, the film seems to have been delayed with a new release date not set.

Bad Moms' Moms
In April 2019, it was announced that Susan Sarandon, Christine Baranski and Cheryl Hines had signed up to appear in a sequel to be called Bad Moms' Moms.

Television series
In February 2018, it was reported that Fox is developing an unscripted reality TV series which would take the films' premise of imperfect parents and shift the focus to real-life moms. The series will be co-produced by Fox Alternative Entertainment and STX Television.

References

External links

 
 
 

2016 films
2010s buddy comedy films
American buddy comedy films
2010s female buddy films
American female buddy films
2010s English-language films
2010s feminist films
Films about dysfunctional families
Films directed by Jon Lucas and Scott Moore
Films scored by Christopher Lennertz
Films with screenplays by Jon Lucas and Scott Moore
Films set in Chicago
Films shot in New Orleans
Huayi Brothers films
STX Entertainment films
2016 comedy films
Films produced by Suzanne Todd
Films produced by Bill Block
Films set in a movie theatre
Films about parenting
2010s American films